The 2018 Kilkenny Intermediate Hurling Championship was the 54th staging of the Kilkenny Intermediate Hurling Championship since its establishment by the Kilkenny County Board in 1929. The championship began on 22 September 2018 and ended on 28 October 2018.

On 28 October 2018, Graigue-Ballycallan won the championship after a 2–16 to 2–13 defeat of Tullaroan in the final at Nowlan Park. It was their second championship overall and their first title since 1987.

Tullogher-Rosbercon's Cian O'Donoghue was the championship's top scorer with 1-29.

Team changes

To Championship

Promoted from the Kilkenny Junior Hurling Championship
 John Locke's

Relegated from the Kilkenny Senior Hurling Championship
 St. Martin's

From Championship

Promoted to the Kilkenny Senior Hurling Championship
 St. Patrick's Ballyragget

Relegated to the Kilkenny Junior Hurling Championship
 Dunnamaggin

Results

First round

Relegation playoff

Quarter-finals

Semi-finals

Final

Championship statistics

Top scorers

Top scorers overall

Top scorers in a single game

References

External links
 Kilkenny GAA website

Kilkenny Intermediate Hurling Championship
Kilkenny Intermediate Hurling Championship